Grisaille ( or ;  , from gris 'grey') is a painting executed entirely in shades of grey or of another neutral greyish colour. It is particularly used in large decorative schemes in imitation of sculpture. Many grisailles include a slightly wider colour range. Paintings executed in brown are referred to as brunaille, and paintings executed in green are called verdaille.

A grisaille may be executed for its own sake, as an underpainting for an oil painting (in preparation for glazing layers of colour over it) or as a model from which an engraver may work (as was done by Rubens and his school). Full colouring of a subject makes many demands of an artist, and working in grisaille was often chosen as it may be quicker and cheaper than traditional painting, although the effect was sometimes deliberately chosen for aesthetic reasons. Grisaille paintings resemble the drawings, normally in monochrome, that artists from the Renaissance on were trained to produce; as with drawings, grisaille can betray the hand of a less-talented assistant more easily than would a fully coloured painting.

History

Giotto used grisaille in the lower registers of his frescoes in the Scrovegni Chapel in Padua and Robert Campin, Jan van Eyck and their successors painted grisaille figures on the outsides of the wings of triptychs, including the Ghent Altarpiece. Originally these were the sides on display for most of the time, as the doors were normally kept closed except on feast days or at the (paid) request of tourists. However, today these images are often invisible in museums when the triptych is displayed open and flat against a wall. In these cases, imitation of sculpture was intended, as sculpture was still more expensive than a painting, even one by an acknowledged master.

Limners often produced illuminated manuscripts in pen and wash with a very limited colour range, and many artists such as Jean Pucelle ( active  1320–1350) and Matthew Paris specialised in such work, which had been especially common in England since Anglo-Saxon times. Renaissance artists such as Mantegna and Polidoro da Caravaggio often used grisaille to imitate the effect of a classical sculptured relief or Roman painting.

In the Low Countries, a continuous tradition of grisaille paintings can be traced from Early Netherlandish painting to Martin Heemskerck (1498–1574), Pieter Brueghel the Elder (Christ and the Woman Taken in Adultery, 1565) and Hendrik Goltzius, and through the copious output of Adriaen van de Venne, to the circle of Rembrandt and Jan van Goyen.

Portions of the ceiling frescoes of the Sistine Chapel are grisaille, as is the lower part of the great staircase decoration by Antonio Verrio ( 1636 – 1707) at Hampton Court.

Modern examples 

Grisaille, while less widespread in the 20th century, continues as an artistic technique. Pablo Picasso's painting Guernica (1937) is a prominent example.

Contemporary American painter Hugo Bastidas has become known for black-and-white paintings that imitate the effect of grisaille and often resemble black-and-white photographs. His medium- and large-scale paintings feature contrasting zones of high and low detail.

Academic study
With the 20th century's emphasis on direct (alla prima) painting, the grisaille technique lost favour with artists of the period. This historic method is still incorporated into the curriculum of some private ateliers.

Enamel and stained glass

The term is also applied to monochrome painting in other media such as those involving enamels, in which an effect similar to a relief in silver may be intended. Grisaille is also common in stained glass, as the need for sections in different colours is greatly reduced. Portions of a window may be done in grisaille using, for example, silver stain or vitreous paint, while other sections are coloured glass.

Gallery

See also 
 Brunaille and verdaille—equivalents to grisaille in brown and green
 Monochrome painting—abstract art executed in a single color
 Pablo Picasso's Blue Period and Rose Period
 Sepia tone (photography)
 Zorn palette

References

External links 

(Metropolitan Museum of Art) Jan Gossart's Saint Jerome Penitent using grisaille
(Metropolitan Museum of Art) Jean-Auguste-Dominique Ingres and workshop, Odalisque in Grisaille

Artistic techniques
Painting techniques
Fresco painting
Renaissance art
Decorative arts
Glass art
Vitreous enamel